Châtelneuf may refer to:

 Châtelneuf, Jura, a commune of the French region of Franche-Comté
 Châtelneuf, Loire, a commune of the French region of Rhône-Alpes
 Essertines-en-Châtelneuf, a commune of France in the Loire department

See also
 Châteauneuf (disambiguation)